Duri, also spelled Doori, is a Korean unisex given name.

Meaning
Unlike most Korean names, which are composed of two Sino-Korean roots each written with one hanja, "Duri" is an indigenous Korean name. It is a Gyeongsang dialect word for "two", as well as a homophone of a differently-spelled standard Korean word meaning "two people" or "a couple". The name was attested as early as the 19th century, and is one of a number of indigenous names which became more popular in South Korea in the late 20th century.

The name Duri could also be recorded in hanja which are picked solely for their sound and not for their meaning (for example,  or ). There are 12 hanja with the reading "du" and 26 hanja with the reading "ri" on the South Korean government's official list of hanja which may be registered for use in given names.

People
People with this name include:
Doo-Ri Chung (born 1973), South Korean-born American female fashion designer
Cha Du-ri (born 1980), South Korean male footballer
Kim Du-ri, South Korean female archer

Fictional
Fictional characters name include:
Doori Koo, a protagonist of the anime series

See also
List of Korean given names

References

Korean unisex given names